Hugh Colohan (c. 1870 – 15 April 1931) was an Irish Labour Party politician. A brick and stone layer before entering politics, he was first elected to Dáil Éireann as a Labour Party Teachta Dála (TD) for the Kildare–Wicklow constituency at the 1922 general election. 

He was re-elected at the 1923 general election for the Kildare constituency and was again re-elected at the June 1927 and September 1927 general elections. He died in office in 1931 and the by-election caused by his death was won by Thomas Harris of Fianna Fáil.

References

1870s births
1931 deaths
Labour Party (Ireland) TDs
Members of the 3rd Dáil
Members of the 4th Dáil
Members of the 5th Dáil
Members of the 6th Dáil
People of the Irish Civil War (Pro-Treaty side)
Politicians from County Kildare